Magnus Nordborg is a biologist specialising in population genetics. He is the scientific director of the Gregor Mendel Institute of the Austrian Academy of Sciences, located at the Vienna Biocenter.

Awards and honours 
In 2003, Nordborg received the Sloan Research Fellowship.

He was elected a fellow of the American Association for the Advancement of Science in 2010. In 2015, he was elected a member of the European Molecular Biology Organization.

Since 2013, he is a corresponding member of the Austrian Academy of Sciences.

References

External links 
 

Living people
Population geneticists
Lund University alumni
Stanford University alumni
University of Southern California faculty
Year of birth missing (living people)